Anders Gar Finnvold (born March 11, 1968 in Boynton Beach, Florida), played baseball first at Palm Beach Community College and then for two years at Florida State University. In his two years at FSU, Finnvold pitched to a 25-7 record with a 2.69 ERA. He was drafted in the sixth round in 1990 by the Boston Red Sox. (He was originally drafted in the 42nd round of the 1987 draft by the Seattle Mariners, but did not sign.)

After three years in the Red Sox minor league system, Finnvold made his major league debut on May 10, 1994. He made eight starts for the Red Sox before an injury sent him to the disabled list and the players' union strike ended the season in August. He finished the season with an 0-4 record and a 5.94 ERA. He never again appeared in the major leagues.

Currently, he sells real estate in Delray Beach, Florida.

Sources
 Career and stats at baseball reference.com

1968 births
Living people
Florida State Seminoles baseball players
Palm Beach State Panthers baseball players
Boston Red Sox players
Pawtucket Red Sox players
Baseball players from Florida
Major League Baseball pitchers
Sportspeople from Delray Beach, Florida
Sportspeople from Boynton Beach, Florida
Elmira Pioneers players
Lynchburg Red Sox players
New Britain Red Sox players